Eliška Jandová (born 9 August 1974) is a Czech rower. She competed in the women's eight event at the 1992 Summer Olympics.

References

1974 births
Living people
Czech female rowers
Olympic rowers of Czechoslovakia
Rowers at the 1992 Summer Olympics
Rowers from Prague